This is a list of German football transfers in the summer transfer window 2007 by club. Only transfers of the Bundesliga, and 2. Bundesliga are included.

Bundesliga

Hertha BSC Berlin

In:

Out:

Note: Flags indicate national team as has been defined under FIFA eligibility rules. Players may hold more than one non-FIFA nationality.

Arminia Bielefeld

In:

Out:

VfL Bochum

In:

Out:

Werder Bremen

In:

Out:

Energie Cottbus

In:

Out:

Borussia Dortmund

In:

Out:

MSV Duisburg

In:

Out:

Eintracht Frankfurt

In:

Out:

Hamburger SV

In:

Out:

Hannover 96

In:

Out:

Karlsruher SC

In:

Out:

Bayer Leverkusen

In:

Out:

FC Bayern Munich

In:

Out:

1. FC Nürnberg

In:

Out:

F.C. Hansa Rostock

In:

Out:

FC Schalke 04

In:

Out:

VfB Stuttgart

In:

Out:

VfL Wolfsburg

In:

Out:

2. Bundesliga

Alemannia Aachen

In:

Out:

FC Erzgebirge Aue

In:

Out:

FC Augsburg

In:

Out:

SC Freiburg

In:

Out:

SpVgg Greuther Fürth

In:

Out:

TSG 1899 Hoffenheim

In:

Out:

FC Carl Zeiss Jena

In:

Out:

1. FC Kaiserslautern

In:

Out:

TuS Koblenz

In:

Out:

1. FC Köln

In:

Out:

1. FSV Mainz

In:

Out:

Borussia Mönchengladbach

In:

Out:

TSV 1860 Munich

In:

Out:

Kickers Offenbach

In:

Out:

VfL Osnabrück

In:

Out:

SC Paderborn

In:

Out:

FC St. Pauli

In:

Out:

SV Wehen Wiesbaden

In:

Out:

See also
 2007–08 Bundesliga
 2007–08 2. Bundesliga
 List of German football transfers winter 2007–08

References

External links
 Official site of the DFB 
 kicker.de 
 Official site of the Bundesliga 
 Official site of the Bundesliga 

Germany
Trans
2007